Mount Douglas Secondary School is a four-year public secondary school founded 1931 and located in Saanich, British Columbia, Canada, with  around 850 students on  roll. The school  is part of the  Greater Victoria School District (SD61), and is known locally  as "Mount Doug".  In 2003, the school changed from a Senior Secondary model, teaching grades 11 and 12, back to the current and original grades 9 to 12 structure.
The school  was  founded  in 1931, and over the years has occupied several  buildings beginning  at the current Cedar Hill Middle School Campus. In 1970, it  relocated to  the former Gordon Head Junior Secondary School building after that school relocated to the newly constructed Arbutus Middle School campus.

Academic programs 
Mount Douglas Secondary is a host campus for the Challenge program, which offers gifted and talented students the opportunity to learn in a classroom environment adapted for a better education. To be accepted into the Challenge program, a student must apply, write a skills test and submit a portfolio of his or her achievements. After being accepted into the Challenge program, a student can choose to attend Mount Douglas or the other school in the district that offers the Challenge program, Esquimalt High School. Mount Doug also runs optional Honors and Advanced Placement programs in addition to the Challenge program. There are 81 full-time teachers employed at Mount Doug.

Notable alumni 

Alex Carroll - Canadian Football Player (Saskatchewan Rough Riders)
Nelly Furtado - recording artist/songwriter
Russ Courtnall - hockey player (Class of 1983)
Michael J. Bryant - former Ontario Attorney General (Class of 1984)
David Foster - music producer (Class of 1967)
Steve Nash - (attended for two months only) NBA player
Brent Hodge - film producer and director (Class of 2003)
Riyo Mori - Miss Universe 2007
Jeff Mallett - former president and COO of Yahoo! Inc.(Class of 1982)
Robert Genn - artist/painter (Class of 1954)
Mel Bridgman - hockey player
Ida Chong - British Columbia MLA and Cabinet Minister
Simon Keith - soccer player (Class of 1983)
Atom Egoyan - film and theatre director
Beau Mirchoff - actor
Taya Valkyrie - Pro Wrestler, Longest Reigning Impact Knockouts Champion

References

External links 
 Mount Douglas High School website

High schools in British Columbia
Educational institutions established in 1931
1931 establishments in British Columbia